The one-sex and two-sex theories are two models of human anatomy or fetal development discussed in Thomas Laqueur's book Making Sex: Body and Gender from the Greeks to Freud. Laqueur theorizes that a fundamental change in attitudes toward human sexual anatomy occurred in Europe in the 18th and 19th centuries. He draws from scholars such as Aristotle and Galen to argue that prior to the eighteenth century, women and men were viewed as two different forms of one essential sex: that is, women were seen to possess the same fundamental reproductive structure as men, the only difference being that female genitalia was inside the body, not outside of it. Anatomists saw the vagina as an interior penis, the labia as foreskin, the uterus as scrotum, and the ovaries as testicles. Laqueur uses the theory of interconvertible bodily fluids as evidence for the one-sex model. However, he claims that around the 18th century, the dominant view became that of two sexes directly opposite to each other. In his view, the departure from a one-sex model is largely because of political shifts which challenged the way women's sexuality came to be seen. One result of this was the emerging view of the female orgasm as nonessential to conception after the eighteenth century. Women and men began to be seen as opposites and each sex was compared in relation to the other. Freud's work further perpetuated the sexual socialization of women by dictating how they should feel pleasure.

Laqueur's theories have been subject to criticism by scholars including Katharine Park, Robert Nye, Helen King, Joan Cadden, and Michael Stolberg for misrepresenting and omitting evidence by earlier scholars, as well as for drawing an overly concrete portrayal of the shift from one-sex to two-sex models.

History

The one-sex theory 

According to Laqueur, prior to the eighteenth century it was acknowledged that there were physical differences between the sex organs of men and women, but these differences were never made to be of significance; "no one was much interested in looking for evidence of two distinct sexes, at the anatomical and concrete physiological differences between men and women, until such differences became politically important." Until the beginning of the eighteenth century, Laqueur claims, the one-sex model dominated medical and philosophical literature and there was a web of knowledge to support it.

Laqueur uses examples from ancient thinkers to help support his claim to the dominance of the one-sex model prior to the eighteenth century. He mentions Galen who asks readers to "think first, please, of the man's [external genitalia] turned in and extending inward between the rectum and the bladder. If this should happen, the scrotum would necessarily take the place of the uterus with the testes lying outside, next to it on either side." For Galen, "women have exactly the same organs as men, but in exactly the wrong places" Women are seen as less perfect versions of men, albeit still a version of them. Laqueur cites Galen's comparison between the eyes of a mole and the genitals of a woman. For Galen "the eyes of the mole have the same structures as the eyes of other animals except that they will not allow the mole to see. They do not open…so to do the female genitalia 'do not open' and remain an imperfect version of what they would be were they thrust out." There were very few specific words associated with either male or female anatomy at the time of Galen. The ancients "regarded organs and their placement as epiphenomena of a greater world order". The absence of words associated with female anatomy shows that people did not want to see a difference between the male and female body. Laqueur argues that philosophers like Aristotle share Galen's views about the one-sex model. Aristotle was committed to the idea of there being two different sexes, but he saw males and females as having certain roles in society, and these roles were not necessarily tied to their bodies. Aristotle said that "all of the male organs are similar in the female except that she has a womb, which presumably, the male does not." Laqueur believes that men and women were seen as comparable variations of one type of sex; that there were many genders at this time, but there was only one sex.

The two-sex theory 

The "one-sex/two-sex" theory claims that the switch from the one-sex model to the two-sex model created the foundations of gender as we know them today. The explanations for this shift are both epistemological and political. In terms of the epistemological, in the beginning of the eighteenth century, experts with authority were determining what was natural and what was not. Michel de Montaigne, a writer during the French Renaissance, writes in his Travel Journal, about a group of young girls who dressed up like males and led their lives as males. For him, this was seen as perfectly normal and that "there is no ontological sex, only organs assigned legal and social status". In the two-sex model though, these experts wanted to create a link between biological sex and theoretical gender and anything transgressing these boundaries was seen as being abnormal. Although it was thought in the one-sex model that feminine men may lactate and that "almost all the men have a great quantity of milk in their breasts", the notion of interconvertibility of fluids among men and women was thrown out the window in the two-sex model. Sex became related to physical facts and the uterus became a justification for the status of women. Gender roles became institutionalized and what was meant to be male or female was based on what the experts thought was natural. Philosophers like Rousseau supported this view and he saw women as being relegated to the private sphere as wives and mothers while men dominated the public sphere.

The "one-sex/two-sex" theory also sees politics as helping to bring about the dominance of the two-sex model. There were endless struggles for power and position occurring between and among men and women. In order to have power over women, men would use sexual anatomy and sexual differences to support their superiority. The subordination of women by men began with the hierarchical ordering of their bodies and ended with their firmly defined gender roles. Thus, "women's protected and conservative role in the household and society was justified by arguments preordained function." Sex was seen as being a major battleground during the French Revolution and "the creation of a bourgeois public sphere...raised with a vengeance the question of which sex(es) ought legitimately to occupy it." Articulate men were the ones who brought about biological evidence to support the notion that women were "unfit for the chimerical spaces that the revolution had inadvertently opened" and thus propagated the notion that women were inferior to men.

Role of science

The one-sex theory 

Renaissance anatomical illustrations depicted a woman as a man turned inside out. Male and female organs were often depicted side by side to demonstrate their correspondence to one another. Anatomist and physician Andreas Vesalius, represented women's organs as versions of man's in all three of his influential works. The vagina was often depicted as long, phallic and almost indistinguishable from a penis. Representation of the anatomical difference between men and women were independent of the actual structures of these organs and "ideology, not accuracy of observation, determined how they were seen and which differences would matter." Often, the only way to distinguish a female set of organs from a male set of organs would be if the illustrator were to cut away the front of what appears to be a womb in his drawing to reveal a child inside. This is because "the more Renaissance anatomists dissected, looked into and visually represented the female body, the more powerfully and convincingly they saw it to be a version of the males"

Physiologically, the one-sex model explains that "in the blood, semen, milk and other fluids of the one-sex body, there is no female and no sharp boundary between the sexes". Different levels of each of the fluids are what would determine gender. The body was also seen as composed of four humours: cold, hot, moist, and dry. Just as with fluid composition, individuals varied in the humoral composition as well. "Though women were always dominated by cold and moist humours, and men by hot and dry humours, difference in sex were seen as differences of degree." In terms of reproduction in the one-sex model, the sex of the child produced by a couple was based on the intermixing of the fluid of a couple. Laqueur discusses the interconvertibility of bodily fluids as a feature of the one-sex model. In particular, he considers various early theories of reproductive fluids by Aristotle, Hippocrates, Galen, and Avicenna.

Aristotle claims the existence of one seed, such that both male and female reproductive fluids originate from blood. However, male sperm is more refined and powerful than its female counterpart. The only distinction between reproductive fluids in this one-seed model is their hierarchy. Hence “the male and female seed cannot be imagined as sexually specific, morphologically distinct, entities”. In Aristotle’s more metaphysical conception, male ejaculate carries the “efficient cause” that acts on the female generative material to bring about conception.

According to Laqueur, the Hippocratic model of sperm interaction is not strictly hierarchized on sex like in Aristotle’s explanation. In this model, sometimes women may produce stronger seed, and men may produce weaker seed. Both quantity and strength of sperm matters: male offspring is generated by strong sperm from both parents, while female offspring is generated by weak sperm from both parents, but in the case that strong and weak sperm are both involved, the offspring’s sex depends on the sperm of greater quantity.

Galen’s model of sperm interaction ranks male seed above female seed in quality. Laqueur explains that Galen considered women’s seed to be true semen of inferior quality to male semen because women have less internal heat than men and are thus are less “perfect”. The same perfect vs. lesser relationship is present between male and female reproductive fluids as in Galen’s model as male and female genitalia. Laqueur expands this discussion through Avicenna’s argument that female seed and menstrual blood are less refined forms of blood, while male seed is a more refined form of blood.

Role of the female orgasm

One-sex theory 

The idea of a woman having to have an orgasm in order to conceive was prevalent in the one-sex model, especially as it aligns with the interconvertibility of bodily fluids in the one-sex model. It was thought by people such as Galen that in order for a woman to get pregnant, she must have an orgasm. When a woman would reach an orgasm, the mouth of her womb would open and suck up the male ejaculate like a sponge. It was thought that both males and females experience an orgasm during intercourse and that both released some sort of fluid, which would mix together and the two emissions would result in conception. Galen and Aristotle point out similarities between male and female genitalia in relation to orgasm: both the penis and the neck of the uterus are areas filled with nerves, and both male and female emissions stimulate the sexual organs. Laqueur also references Avicenna's similar comparison that the flesh of both sexes is brought to arousal by the emission of fluids. Under the economy of bodily fluids, the presence of both male and female seed and orgasms points to a sexless conception of libido that fits in a one-sex model.

The observation that women have organs that resemble those of men and experience orgasms as men do would seem to assign them an equally active role in conception as men. Women needed to orgasm to produce fluids during intercourse that would stir with the male ejaculate to conceive a child. Laqueur notes that "the fact that women had gonads like men, that they had sexual desires, that they generally produced fluid during intercourse and presumably showed signs of 'delight and concussion', all confirmed the orgasm/conception link." In Laqueur's one-sex model, the exception to this orgasm-conception link is Aristotle, who sought to separate orgasm from conception to preserve his asymmetrical view of men as providing the "efficient cause" and women the "material cause" during generation.

Two-sex theory 

As opposed to the one-sex model, the two-sex model held that a woman could conceive without an orgasm. At the beginning of Making Sex, Laqueur relates the anecdote of a beautiful young woman who was in a deathlike coma. She was raped by a young monk and conceived a child. This story challenges the one-sex notion that a woman needs to experience an orgasm in order to conceive. By saying that conception was not related to orgasm, sexual pleasure for women seemed to lose importance. Further, Laqueur claims that this newfound absence of the female orgasm during conception motivated a new relationship between male and female bodies. When in the eighteenth century it became a possibility that "the majority of women are not much troubled with sexual feelings, the presence of or absence of orgasm became a biological signpost of sexual difference." Whereas orgasm was seen as a shared phenomenon between sexes under Laqueur's one-sex model, he proposes that the irrelevance of the female orgasm after the eighteenth century became a determinant of female anatomical and sexual difference. Women were to be seen as passionless and not enjoying sex.

It was also thought prior to the eighteenth century that ovulation corresponded to sexual intercourse. Biologists at this time had very little knowledge of what actually governed the production of an egg. However, Laqueur claims that scientific advances in the eighteenth century had little to do with the declining importance of the female orgasm to conception, or more generally, with the shift to the two-sex model. Because sexual difference is already laden with cultural constructs, Laqueur writes that "the nature of sexual difference is not susceptible to empirical testing." Rather, he proposes that political and social changes ignited the interest in searching for anatomical differences between men and women.

According to Laqueur, the declining importance of the female orgasm during conception cannot be attributed to a lack of knowledge about female genitalia either. There was biological evidence around the nineteenth century that parts of the female anatomy, specifically the clitoris "contributes "a large share, and perhaps the greater part, of the gratification which the female derives from sexual intercourse."" However, one 1836 handbook that Laqueur references also claims that women could experience orgasms without physically feeling them. Laqueur uses this example to explain that female anatomy and sexuality are defined according to "the demands of culture." He concludes that it was "culture and not biology that was the basis for claims bearing on the role and even the existence of female pleasure. The body shifted easily in the eighteenth century from its supposedly foundational role to become not the cause but the sign of gender."

Sex socialized 

The change from the one-sex model to the two-sex model helped to create a new understanding of gender in the meaning of human history. There is an "increasing differentiation of male and female social roles; conversely, a greater differentiation of roles and a greater female 'delicacy and sensibility' are [seen as] signs of moral progress." If men and women are seen as being physically different, then they must be treated differently as well.

In the two-sex model, since there are physical differences between men and women, there must be differences in how they receive pleasure. Sigmund Freud tries to explain the functions of the clitoris by challenging the preconceived notions about it. Freud feels that "if we are to understand how a little girl turns into a woman, we must further follow the vicissitudes of [the] excitability of the clitoris." He sees the clitoris as being "the organ through which excitement is transmitted to the 'adjacent female sexual parts' to its permanent home, the true locus of a woman's erotic life, the vagina." For Freud he uses the analogy of the clitoris as "pine shavings [used to] set a log of harder wood on fire". For Freud, there is no real female interior if pleasure can transfer from the clitoris to the vagina. Freud tries to provide evidence for a vaginal orgasm and he makes it so a clitoral orgasm is seen to be adolescence. By downplaying the role of the clitoris, he makes women's sexual needs seen as being inferior and secondary to those of men. He says that "whenever a woman is incapable of achieving an orgasm via coitus, provided the husband is an adequate partner, and prefers clitoral stimulation to any other form of sexual activity, she can be regarded as suffering from frigidity and requires psychiatric assistance." In the two-sex model, it is seen that Freud "must be regarded as a narrative of culture in anatomical disguise. The tale of the clitoris is a parable of culture, of how the body is forged into a shape valuable to civilization despite, not because of itself". Freud changed the meaning of the clitoris and contributes to the notion of the passionless woman.

Laqueur says that there was obvious evidence around in Freud's time that the clitoris was in fact the source of pleasure in women. François Mauriceau notes that the clitoris is "where the author of Nature has placed the seat of voluptuousness – as he has in the glans of the penis – where the most exquisite sensibility is located, and where he placed the origins of lasciviousness in women." The vagina on the other hand was seen as "a far duller organ" and "only the glands near its outer end are relevant to sexual pleasure because they pour out great quantities of a saline liquor during coitus, which increases the heat and enjoyment of women". By changing the meaning of the clitoral orgasm, Freud seems to be putting women in opposition to men and further assigning women to socially assigned roles. To say that a woman is supposed to orgasm through her vagina as opposed to her clitoris "works against the organic structures of the body." In Laqueur's "one-sex/two-sex" theory, he sees Freud as being instrumental in the sexual socialization of women. He feels that "the cultural myth of vaginal orgasm is told in the language of science. And thus, not thanks to but in spite of neurology, a girl becomes the Viennese bourgeois ideal of a woman."

Criticism 

Scholars such as Katharine Park, Robert Nye, Helen King, Joan Cadden, and Michael Stolberg have criticized Laqueur's theory on the grounds that his described shift from one-sex to two-sex does not reflect a thorough reading of historical sources. 

According to Park and Nye, Laqueur synthesizes conflicting accounts of sex and anatomy by Aristotle and Galen in order to craft the impression of a uniformly accepted one-sex model prior to the eighteenth century. In Park and Nye's account, Laqueur mistakenly takes early anatomists’ comparisons between male and female genitalia as evidence that, in their view, “the vagina really is a penis, and the uterus is a scrotum.” Park and Nye also remark that Laqueur does not locate the historical evidence he uses within culturally and historically specific definitions of sex; instead, he uses it out of context to fit a modern understanding of sex and gender. In particular, Laqueur reduces the metaphysical distinctions Renaissance philosophers made between men and women to sociological categories of gender, while still maintaining that there must have only been one anatomical sex.  

King echoes Park and Nye in the claim that the one-sex and two-sex models seem to have coexisted throughout history, and were not segregated by era as Laqueur suggests. King argues that the one-sex and two-sex models, on paper, could be a useful tool of historical enquiry but they have not been read that way. She writes that the theories in Making Sex are appealing because Laqueur conceptualizes a simple chronological narrative of his one-sex and two-sex models, even at the cost of historical context and nuance. For instance, Laqueur omits sections of his pre-eighteenth century sources that portray men and woman in a balanced one-sex model due to their reciprocal anatomy, instead proposing a one-sex model that centers male anatomy and defines female anatomy as the inverse. The use of these models creates a static perception of the period, damaged by arbitrary divisions of 'before' and 'after' that were not relevant to people at the time. 

Stolberg provides evidence to suggest that significant two-sex understandings of anatomy existed before Laqueur claims, arguing that sexual dimorphism was accepted as early as the sixteenth century. He discusses the influence of the uterus on medical discussion as proof that understandings of the body were noticeably 'sexed' in the 1600s. He also argues that differences between the sexes were accepted in the early modern period under the proviso that woman's biology was fit for purpose, i.e., motherhood. Further, Stolberg contests Laqueur’s claim that sexual dimorphism arose merely in response to Enlightenment ideals of equality, as a means of keeping women insubordinate. He cites a complex network of other reasons for the shift to sexual dimorphism. These include a renewed emphasis on empirical observation during the sixteenth and seventeenth centuries as well as a shift away from humorism. 

Joan Cadden has pointed out that 'one-sex' models of the body were already treated with scepticism in the ancient and medieval periods, and that Laqueur's periodisation of the shift from one-sex to two-sex was not as clear-cut as he made it out to be.

References

Citations

Cited works 

 
 
 
 
 

Human sexuality